W.R.J.M. "Inez" Pijnenburg-Adriaenssen  (born 13 May 1949) is a Dutch politician of the People's Party for Freedom and Democracy (VVD).

Pijnenburg was a member of the States-Provincial of Gelderland from 1999 to 2002. She was an alderman of Arnhem from 2002 to 2006. From 2007 to 2008 she was acting mayor of Neder-Betuwe, and since 2008 she has been mayor of Heerde.

References

1949 births
Living people
Aldermen in Gelderland
People from Arnhem
Dutch civil servants
Mayors in Gelderland
Members of the Provincial Council of Gelderland
People's Party for Freedom and Democracy politicians
Women mayors of places in the Netherlands